William Tilden may refer to:

 Sir William A. Tilden (1842–1926), British chemist
 Bill Tilden (1893–1953), American tennis player